Table tennis has been part of the African Games since 1973 in Lagos, Nigeria.

Editions

Events

References
Sports123
ITTF Database

 
All-Africa Games
Sports at the African Games
All-Africa Games